is the 14th studio album by the Japanese girl group Morning Musume '14. It was released in Japan on October 29, 2014.

Release history 
The album's release and its title were announced at the Morning Musume 18th anniversary concert that took place on September 14, 2014, at the Shinagawa Stellar Ball in Tokyo. Hello! Project producer Tsunku, recuperating from laryngeal cancer, didn't attend, but he sent a message in which he made the announcement. He also revealed that the album would feature surprise combinations of the group members singing songs together.

The album was released in three versions: Limited Edition A (CD + DVD) which is packaged in a digipak case with a booklet, Limited Edition B (CD + DVD), and Regular Edition (CD only). Both limited editions include a serial-numbered lottery card.

It is the last album to feature Sayumi Michishige, Riho Sayashi, and Kanon Suzuki.

Track listing

References

External links 
 Album profile on the Hello! Project official site
 Album profile on the Up-Front Works official site

2014 albums
Morning Musume albums
Zetima albums
Japanese-language albums
Albums produced by Tsunku
Dance-pop albums by Japanese artists
Electropop albums